Itahara Uparwar is a village in Deegh Mandal, Sant Ravidas Nagar District, Uttar Pradesh State. Itahara Uparwar is 37.9 km from its District Main City Gyanpur and 221 km from its State Main City Lucknow. At this place the Ganges flows to the west to east.

A temple, Baba Gangeshwarnath Dham, is situated in this village. It was made by Shiv Lal Singh with the help of Kashi Naresh.

Demographics 

As of 2001 India census, Itahara Uparwar had a population of 3192. Males constitute 52% (1655) of the population and females 48% (1537); now its population is about 7069.

References

 http://censusindia.gov.in/PopulationFinder/Sub_Districts_Master.aspx?state_code=09&district_code=68

Villages in Bhadohi district